The Graduate Institute of International and Development Studies, or the Geneva Graduate Institute, abbreviated IHEID, is a government-accredited postgraduate institution of higher education located in Geneva, Switzerland. The current Geneva Graduate Institute was formed by a merger between the Graduate Institute of International Studies (abbreviated IHEI or HEI) and the Graduate Institute of Development Studies (abbreviated IUED) in 2008.

The institution counts one UN secretary-general (Kofi Annan), seven Nobel Prize recipients, one Pulitzer Prize winner, and numerous ambassadors, foreign ministers, and heads of state among its alumni and faculty. Founded by two senior League of Nations officials, the Graduate Institute maintains strong links with that international organisation's successor, the United Nations, and many alumni have gone on to work at UN agencies.

Admission to the Graduate Institute's study programmes is highly competitive, with a selection rate of even less than one out of every five candidates.

Founded in 1927, the Graduate Institute of International Studies (IHEI or HEI) was continental Europe's oldest school of international relations and was the world's first graduate institute dedicated solely to the study of international affairs. It offered one of the first doctoral programmes in international relations in the world. In 2008, the Graduate Institute absorbed the Graduate Institute of Development Studies, a smaller postgraduate institution also based in Geneva founded in 1961. The merger resulted in the current Graduate Institute of International and Development Studies.

Today the school enrolls close to a thousand postgraduate students from over 100 countries. Foreign students make up nearly 90% of the student body and the school is officially a bilingual English-French institution, although the majority of classes are in English. With Maison de la Paix acting as its primary seat of learning, the institute's campuses are located blocks from the United Nations Office at Geneva, International Labour Organization, World Trade Organization, World Health Organization, International Committee of the Red Cross, World Intellectual Property Organization and many other international organisations.

It runs joint degree programmes with universities such as Smith College and Yale University, and is Harvard Kennedy School's only partner institution to co-deliver double degrees. The school is a member of the Association of Professional Schools of International Affairs (APSIA), a group of schools that specialize in public policy, public administration, and international affairs.

History 

The Graduate Institute of International Studies was co-founded in 1927 by two scholar-diplomats working for the League of Nations Secretariat: the Swiss William Rappard, director of the Mandates Section, and the Frenchman Paul Mantoux, director of the Political Section.A bilingual institution like the League, it was to train personnel for the nascent international organisation. Its co-founder, Rappard, served as director from 1928 to 1955.

The institute's original mandate was based on a close working relationship with both the League of Nations and the International Labour Organization. It was agreed that in exchange for training staff and delegates, the Institute would receive intellectual resources and diplomatic expertise (guest lecturers, etc.) from the aforementioned organisations. According to its statutes, the Graduate Institute was "an institution intended to provide students of all nations the means of undertaking and pursuing international studies, most notably of a historic, judicial, economic, political and social nature."

The institute managed to attract a number of eminent faculty and lecturers, particularly from countries mired in oppressive Nazi regimes, e.g.,  and Georges Scelle for law, Maurice Bourquin for diplomatic history, and the rising young Swiss jurist, Paul Guggenheim. Indeed, it is said that William Rappard had observed, ironically, that the two men to whom the Institute owed its greatest debt were Mussolini and Hitler. Subsequently, more noted scholars would join the institute's faculty. Hans Kelsen, the well-known theorist and philosopher of law, Guglielmo Ferrero, Italian historian, and Carl Burckhardt, scholar and diplomat all called the Graduate Institute home. Other arrivals, similarly seeking refuge from dictatorships, included the eminent free market economy historian, Ludwig von Mises, and another economist, Wilhelm Ropke, who greatly influenced German postwar liberal economic policy as well as the development of the theory of a social market system.

After a number of years, the Institute had developed a system whereby cours temporaires were given by prominent intellectuals on a week, semester, or yearlong basis. These cours temporaires were the intellectual showcase of the institute, attracting such names as Raymond Aron, René Cassin, Luigi Einaudi, John Kenneth Galbraith, G. P. Gooch, Gottfried Haberler, Friedrich von Hayek, Hersch Lauterpacht, Lord McNair, Gunnar Myrdal, Harold Nicolson, Philip Noel Baker, Pierre Renouvin, Lionel Robbins, Count Carlo Sforza, Jacob Viner, and Martin Wight.

Another cours temporaire professor, Montagu Burton Professor of International Relations at Oxford University, Sir Alfred Zimmern, left a particularly lasting mark on the institute. As early as 1924, while serving on the staff of the International Council for intellectual Cooperation in Paris, Zimmern began organizing international affairs summer schools under the auspices of the University of Geneva, 'Zimmern schools', as they became known. The initiative operated in parallel with the early planning for the launch of the Graduate Institute and the experience acquired by the former helped to shape the latter.

Despite its small size, (before the 1980s the faculty never exceeded 25 members), the Institute boasts four faculty members who have received Nobel Prizes for economics – Gunnar Myrdal, Friedrich von Hayek, Maurice Allais, and Robert Mundell. Three alumni have been Nobel laureates.

For a period of almost thirty years (1927–1954) the school was funded predominantly through the support of the Rockefeller Foundation. Since then the canton of Geneva and the Swiss Federal Council bear most of the costs associated with the institute. This transfer of financial responsibility coincided with the 1955 arrival of William Rappard's successor as director of the institute, Lausanne historian Jacques Freymond. Freymond inaugurated a period of great expansion, increasing the range of subjects taught and the number of both students and faculty, a process that continued well after his retirement in 1978. Under Freymond's tenure, the Graduate Institute hosted many international colloquia that discussed preconditions for East–West negotiations, relations with China and its rising influence in world affairs, European integration, techniques and results of politico-socioeconomic forecasting (the famous early Club of Rome reports, and the Futuribles project led by Bertrand de Jouvenel), the causes and possible antidotes to terrorism, Pugwash Conference concerns and much more. Freymond's term also saw many landmark publications, including the Treatise on international law by Professor Paul Guggenheim and the six-volume compilation of historical documents relating to the Communist International.

The parallel history of the Graduate Institute of Development Studies (IUED) also involves Freymond, who founded the institution in 1961 as the Institut Africain de Genève, or African Institute of Geneva. The Graduate Institute of Development Studies was among the pioneer institutions in Europe to develop the scholarly field of sustainable development. The school was also known for the critical view of many of its professors on development aid, as well as for its journal, the Cahiers de l'IUED It was at the center of a huge international network.

Recent merger 

In 2008, the Graduate Institute of International Studies, absorbed the Graduate Institute of Development Studies, to create the current Graduate Institute of International and Development Studies (IHEID).

Academics 
Admission to the Graduate Institute's study programmes is highly competitive, with only 14% of applicants attending the Graduate Institute in 2014. The Institute awards its own degrees. It does not award undergraduate degrees.

Ranking 
As a small institution offering exclusively master's and PhD programmes, the institute does not participate in popular university ranking.

In Foreign Policy'''s 2014 Inside the Ivory Tower ranking of best international relations schools in the world, the Graduate Institute's master's program was ranked 24th among Master's Programs for Policy Career in International Relations. It ranked 29th in 2018.
In 2012, The Graduate Institute was listed among the Foreign Policy Association's "Top 50 International Affairs Graduate Programs."

The LL.M. in international dispute settlement, offered jointly with the University of Geneva by the Geneva Center for International Dispute Settlement, was ranked second worldwide according to a 2012 survey of law firms conducted by the Global Arbitration Review. This same LL.M. also consistently featured in the top 10 LL.M. for alternative dispute resolution by the specialised website LLM-guide.

The Graduate Institute's LL.M. in international law also featured in the top 10 LL.M. for public international law compiled by LLM-guide.

The Geneva Academy of International Humanitarian Law and Human Rights' LL.M. in international humanitarian law and human rights—a joint programme between the Graduate Institute and the University of Geneva—also featured in LLM-guide's top 10 LL.M. programmes for human rights law.

 Degree programmes 

 Master of Arts in International Affairs (MIA) 
The MIA is an intensive two-year interdisciplinary Master programme which begins with a rigorous foundation in quantitative and qualitative methods and in all the disciplines of the institute. In addition to their coursework, students must typically complete a capstone applied research project, two skills workshops, and a thesis between 15,000 and 25,000 words. Students can choose to specialize in one of three thematic tracks: Trade & International Finance; Global Security; and Environment, Resources & Sustainability.

 Master of Arts in Development Studies (MDEV) 
The MDEV is an intensive two-year interdisciplinary Master programme which begins with a rigorous foundation in quantitative and qualitative methods and in all the disciplines of the institute. In addition to their coursework, students must typically complete a capstone applied research project, two skills workshops, and a thesis between 15,000 and 25,000 words. Students can choose to specialize in one of three thematic tracks: Mobilities, Spaces & Cities; Power, Conflict & Development; and Environment, Resources & Sustainability.

 Disciplinary Master's degree (MA/MPhil/LLM Res equivalent) 
An advanced disciplinary two-year master's programme is offered by each of the Graduate Institute's five academic departments: Anthropology & Sociology, International Economics, International History, International Law, and International Relations & Political Science. In general, the disciplinary programme includes taught coursework and workshops that prepare students for conducting research and writing their master's thesis during their final semester. As regards the law programme, the first year is substantively equivalent to an LLM, whereas the second year is designed to prepare students for studies at the doctoral level.

In addition, a number of students transition during the MPhil to PhD status by way of the Fast Track programme.

 Doctorate (PhD) 
PhD students specialize in one disciplinary field. PhD candidates who wish to carry out bi-disciplinary research choose a main discipline (a major) and a second discipline (a minor).

 Executive masters 
Executive education programmes include masters in International Law, International Negotiation and Policy-Making, Development Policies and Practices.

 Partnerships 
The Graduate Institute has established joint or dual degree programmes with: the MPA programme at Harvard Kennedy School; the LLM in Global Health Law programme at the Georgetown University's Law Center; the BA programme at Yale University's Jackson School of Global Affairs; the BA programme at Peking University; the BA programme at Smith College; the BA programme at Wellesley College; the BA programme at the University of Hong Kong, and with the University of Geneva's LLM in International Dispute Settlement, LLM in International Humanitarian Law and Human Rights, Master's in Transitional Justice, and Master's of Advanced Studies in Humanitarian Action.

Apart from the dual/joint degree programmes, students also have the option to spend an exchange semester at Georgetown Law School, Harvard University Law School, Michigan Law School, UCLA School of Law, Boston University School of Law, Yale University, the Elliott School of International Affairs at George Washington University, the Fletcher School of Law and Diplomacy at Tufts University, School of International Service at American University in Washington D.C., Northwestern University, University of Toronto, Sciences Po Paris – Institut d'Études Politiques de Paris, the Hertie School of Governance in Berlin, Bocconi University in Italy, Libera Università Internazionale degli Studi Sociali Guido Carli in Italy, Central European University in Vienna, the Graduate School of International Studies at Seoul National University, the Lee Kuan Yew School of Public Policy at the National University of Singapore, the Graduate School of Asia-Pacific Studies at Waseda University, University of Hong Kong, Tsinghua University, Fudan University, Peking University, KIMEP University, Gadjah Mada University, the School of International Studies at Jawaharlal Nehru University, University of Malaya, the American University in Cairo, Boğaziçi University in Turkey, Pontifical Catholic University of Rio de Janeiro, Pontifical Catholic University of Peru, El Colegio de México, the Uniandes, the University of Ghana, Cheikh Anta Diop University, Stellenbosch University, as well as the University of St. Gallen and ETH Zürich in Switzerland.

Furthermore, the Graduate Institute is an active member of the following associations and academic networks:
APSIA – Association of Professional Schools of International Affairs: academic institutions specialising in international relations and international public policy are represented among APSIA's thirty-odd members.
European University Association: Represents and supports more than 850 institutions of higher education in 46 countries, providing them with a forum for cooperation and exchange of information on higher education and research policies.
Europaeum: Created at the initiative of the University of Oxford, the Europaeum is composed of ten leading European institutions of higher education and research.
European Consortium for Political Research: The ECPR is an independent scholarly association that supports the training, research and cross-national cooperation of many thousands of academics and graduate students specialising in political science and all its sub-disciplines.
European Association of Development Research and Training Institutes: The EADI is the largest existing network of research and training institutes active in the field of development studies.
Agence Universitaire de la Francophonie: The AUF supports the build-up a French-language research area between French-speaking universities. The institute is one of 536 members belonging to the AUF and takes part in its exchange programmes in the fields of teaching and research.
Swiss University Conference: The SUC is a governmental organisation tasked with accrediting officially recognized Swiss universities.

 Campus 

 Maison de la paix 
The Graduate Institute's main campus is the Maison de la paix (literally "House of Peace"), which opened in 2013. The Maison de la Paix is a 38,000 meter-square glass building distributed into six connected sections. It contains the Davis Library, which holds 350,000 books about social sciences, journals and annual publications, making it one of Europe's richest libraries in the fields of development and international relations. It is named after two Institute alumni—Ambassador Shelby Cullom Davis and his wife Kathryn Davis, following the Davis' $10 million donation to the institute.

The neighboring Picciotto Student Residence was completed in 2012 and provides 135 apartments for students and visiting professors. Another, larger student residence, the Grand Morillon Student Residence, opened in 2021. Japanese architect Kengo Kuma designed the 680-bed student housing building.

In addition to serving as the institute's main campus, the Maison de la paix also houses policy centres and advocacy groups with close ties to the Institute such as the Geneva Centre for the Democratic Control of Armed Forces (DCAF), the Geneva Centre for Security Policy (GCSP) the Geneva International Centre for Humanitarian Demining, Interpeace, the International Institute of Humanitarian Law and the World Business Council for Sustainable Development.

 Historic villas 
Another section of the campus are two historic villas situated by Lake Geneva, Villa Barton and Villa Moynier. Villa Barton served as the institute's main campus for most of the school's history. It now mostly houses administrative staff. Villa Moynier, created in 2001 and which opened in October 2009, houses the Institute-based Geneva Academy of International Humanitarian Law and Human Rights and Geneva Center for International Dispute Settlement. The building holds a symbolic significance as it was originally owned by Gustave Moynier, co-founder of the International Committee of the Red Cross, and subsequently used by the League of Nations and as the headquarters of the ICRC between 1933 and 1946.

 Research 
The institute's research activities are conducted both at fundamental and applied levels with the objective of bringing analysis to international actors, private or public, of main contemporary issues. These research activities are conducted by the faculty of the institute, as part of their individual work, or by interdisciplinary teams within centres and programmes whose activity focus on these main fields:
Conflict, security, and peacebuilding
Development policies and practices
Culture, religion, and identity
Dispute settlement
Environment and natural resources
Finance and development
Gender
Globalisation
Governance
Humanitarian action
Migration and refugees
Non-state actors and civil society
Rural development
Trade, regionalism, and integration

Furthermore, the Graduate Institute is home to the Curt Gasteyger Chair in International Security and Conflict Studies, the André Hoffmann Chair in Environmental Economics, the Pictet Chair in Finance and Development, the UNESCO Chair in Comparative Education Policy, and the Claude Ségré Chair on Conservation and Development.

 Programmes and research centres 
The centres and programmes of the Institute distribute analysis and research that contributes to the analysis of international organisations headquartered in Geneva:
The Centre on Conflict, Development and Peacebuilding is for research in the areas of conflict analysis, peacebuilding, and the complex relationships between security and development.
The Centre for International Environmental Studies was established in 2010 for the purpose of developing political, legal and economic discourse on problems related to the global environment.
The Centre for Trade and Economic Integration brings together the research activities of eminent professors of economics, law and political science in the area of trade, economic integration and globalization. The Centre provides a forum for discussion and dialogue between the global research community, including the institute's student body and research centres in the developing world, and the international business community, as well as international organisations and NGOs.
The Centre for Finance and Development's research deals with finance and development at three levels: international finance, and development finance in particular, including the role played by the international financial institutions such as the IMF and the World Bank; financial development, including banking and financial sector development in emerging and developing countries, both from contemporary and historical perspectives; microeconomics of finance and development.
The Global Governance Centre provides a forum for scholars of governance and international organisations to interact with practitioners from the policy world in order to analyse global governance arrangements across a variety of issues.
The Global Health Centre's activities focus on two pillars, namely global health governance and global health diplomacy.
The Global Migration Centre focus on the transnational dimensions of migration and its interdisciplinary orientation. It combines inputs from lawyers, political scientists, economists, historians, anthropologists and sociologists.
The Albert Hirschman Centre on Democracy.
The Gender Centre produces research on the workings of gender in development and international relations and serves as a channel for the dissemination of such knowledge in both the anglophone and the francophone worlds.
The Small Arms Survey is an independent research project that serves as the principal international source of public information on all aspects of small arms and armed violence and as a resource for governments, policy-makers, researchers, and activists.

 Publications 
Refugee Survey Quarterly – Published by Oxford University Press and based at the Graduate Institute, the Refugee Survey Quarterly is a peer-reviewed journal focusing on the challenges of forced migration from multidisciplinary and policy-oriented perspectives.
Journal of International Dispute Settlement – Established by the Graduate Institute and the University of Geneva in 2010, the JIDS is dedicated to international law with commercial, economic and financial implications. It is published by Oxford University Press.
International Development Policy – A peer-reviewed e-journal that promotes cutting-edge research and policy debates on global development.
European Journal of Development Research – The European Journal of Development Research is a co-publication of the Graduate Institute and the European Association of Development Research and Training Institutes with a multi-disciplinary focus.
Medicine Anthropology Theory – Medicine Anthropology Theory is an open-access journal that publishes scholarly articles, essays, reviews, and reports related to medical anthropology and science and technology studies.
Relations Internationales – Relations Internationales publishes research on international relations history ranging from the end of the 19th century to recent history.

 Organisation 

 Legal status 
IHEID is constituted as a Swiss private law foundation, Fondation pour les hautes études internationales et du développement, sharing a convention with the University of Geneva. This is a particular organisational form, because IHEID is constituted as a foundation of private law fulfilling a public purpose. In addition, the political responsibility for the Institute shared between the Swiss Confederation and the canton of Geneva. Usually in Switzerland, it is the responsibility of the cantons to run public universities, except for the Federal Institutes of Technology (ETHZ and EPFL). IHEID is therefore something like a hybrid institution, in-between the two standard categories.

 Foundation Board 
The Foundation Board is the administrative body of the institute. It assembles academics, politicians, people of public life and practitioners. It includes among others: Carlos Lopes, currently UN under secretary general and executive secretary of the Economic Commission for Africa, Julia Marton-Lefèvre (former director general of the International Union for Conservation of Nature),  (journalist), and Tamar Manuelyan Atinc, (a former World Bank vice president).

 Administration 
The institute is headed by Marie-Laure Salles.

 Notable alumni 

The Graduate Institute has more than 18,000 alumni working around the world. Notable alumni and faculty include one UN secretary-general (Kofi Annan), seven Nobel Prize recipients, one Pulitzer Prize winner, and numerous ambassadors, foreign ministers, and heads of state.
Kofi Annan – former secretary-general of the United Nations and 2001 Nobel Peace Prize recipient
Rafael Grossi – Director General of the International Atomic Energy Agency
Mohamed ElBaradei – Egyptian jurist and diplomat, former director general of the International Atomic Energy Agency and 2005 Nobel Peace Prize recipient
Leonid Hurwicz – Polish-American economist and mathematician, Nobel Memorial Prize in Economics in 2007
Micheline Calmy-Rey – former president of Switzerland
Kurt Furgler – former president of Switzerland
Michel Kafando – interim president of Burkina Faso
Alpha Oumar Konaré – ex-president of Mali
Henri, Grand Duke of Luxembourg
Jakaya Mrisho Kikwete – fourth president of Tanzania
Nazim al-Qudsi - former President of Syria (1961-1963)

 Gallery 

 Academic awards and prizes conferred 

The Paul Guggenheim Prize in International Law was created in 1981 and is awarded to young practitioners of international law on a biannual basis. The Edgar de Picciotto International Prize is awarded every two years and worth 100,000 Swiss Francs. It rewards an internationally renowned academic whose research has contributed to enhancing the understanding of global challenges and whose work has influenced policy-makers.

 Notable faculty 

 Former Faculty 

Georges Abi-Saab – International law specialist, former chairman of the Appellate Body of the World Trade Organization.
Maurice Allais – French economist and recipient of the 1988 Nobel Memorial Prize in Economics.
Carl Jacob Burckhardt - Swiss historian, diplomat, and president of the ICRC.
Kemal Dervis – professor of economics, former head of the United Nations Development Programme and former minister of economic affairs of Turkey.
Pierre-Marie Dupuy - French jurist, renowned expert of international arbitration.
Guglielmo Ferrero - Italian historian.
Saul Friedländer –  Israeli historian of Germany and Jewish history at UCLA, 2008 Pulitzer Prize recipient.
Emmanuel Gaillard – Leading authority on international commercial arbitration
Paul Guggenheim – Swiss international jurist.
Harry Gordon Johnson – Canadian economist who made many contributions to the development of Hecksher-Ohlin theory.
Friedrich von Hayek –  Prominent Austrian school economist, co-recipient of the 1974 Nobel Memorial Prize in Economics.
Hans Kelsen – Noted international jurist and legal philosopher.
Dimitri Kitsikis – Noted Greek Turkologist.
Olivier Long – Swiss international law specialist and former director-general of the GATT (1968–80).
Theodor Meron – Former president of the International Criminal Tribunal for the former Yugoslavia (ICTY)
Ludwig von Mises – Prominent Austrian school economist, philosopher, and classical liberal.
Robert Mundell – Canadian international economist and recipient of the 1999 Nobel Memorial Prize in Economics.
Gunnar Myrdal –  Swedish economist and co-recipient of the 1974 Nobel Memorial Prize in Economics.
Shalini Randeria – American-born Indian anthropologist, Central European University's sixth president and rector.
William Rappard – economic historian, director of the League of Nations Mandate Section (1920–1925), and Swiss delegate to the ILO (1945–1956).
Wilhelm Röpke – International economics and spiritual father of the German social market economy.
Jacob Viner – Canadian international economics and early member of the Chicago School of Economics.
Jean Ziegler – Swiss sociologist, author and public intellectual.

 Current Faculty 

William M. Adams – Claudio Segré Chair of Conservation and Development.
Jean-Louis Arcand – professor of international economics, director of the Centre for Finance and Development.
Richard Baldwin – acclaimed international trade economist.
Jean-François Bayart – Political scientist specialized in sub-Saharan Africa.
Thomas J. Biersteker – Curt Gasteyger Professor of International Security, Council on Foreign Relations scholar, sanctions consultant for UN Security Council and former director of the Watson Institute for International Studies at Brown University.
Gilles Carbonnier – professor of development economics and vice-president of the International Committee of the Red Cross. 
Andrew Clapham – professor of international law, former representative of Amnesty International at the United Nations, and former adviser on international humanitarian law to the Special Representative of the U.N. secretary-general in Iraq.
Tim Flannery – Segré Foundation Distinguished Visiting professor, Australian of the Year 2007, mammalogist, palaeontologist, environmentalist and former chief commissioner of the Federal Climate Commission.
Ilona Kickbusch – Adjunct professor, leading thinker in the fields of health promotion and global health.
Marcelo Kohen, professor of international law, secretary-general of the Institut de Droit International.
Nico Krisch – professor of international law specializing in constitutional theory, and global governance.
Keith Krause – professor of international relations, director of the Small Arms Survey.
Jussi Hanhimäki – professor of international history, recipient of the 2002 Bernath Prize for his book The Flawed Architect: Henry Kissinger and American Foreign Policy.
Susanna Hecht – professor of international history whose early work on the deforestation of the Amazon led to the founding of the subfield of political ecology.
Xiang Lanxin – Chinese scholar of international relations and the history of modern China
Anna Leander – professor of international relations well known for her work in critical security studies and international political sociology.
Giacomo Luciani – Leading scholar on the geopolitics of energy.
Peter Maurer  – senior distinguished fellow and president of the International Committee of the Red Cross.
Mohamed Mahmoud Ould Mohamedou – professor of international history and politics and acclaimed specialist of political violence and international security.
Ugo Panizza – Pictet Professor of Development and Finance.
Joost Pauwelyn – professor of international law, famous scholar in WTO law and public international law, Murase Visiting professor of law at Georgetown Law School.
Gita Steiner-Khamsi – professor of comparative and international education.
Timothy Swanson – André Hoffmann Professor of Environmental Economics.
Jorge E. Viñuales – Adjunct professor of environmental law and Harold Samuel Professor of Law and Environmental Policy at the University of Cambridge.
Beatrice Weder di Mauro – professor of international macroeconomics and president of the Centre for Economic Policy Research
Charles Wyplosz –  professor of international economics, regular columnist in the Financial Times, Le Monde, Libération, Le Figaro, Finanz und Wirtschaft, and Handelsblatt.

 References 

 Bibliography The Graduate Institute of International Studies Geneva: 75 years of service towards peace through learning and research in the field of international relations'', The Graduate Institute, 2002.

External links 

 
 

 
Universities and colleges in Switzerland
Maison de la Paix
Research institutes in Switzerland
Schools of international relations
Educational institutions established in 1927
1927 establishments in Switzerland